The People's Monarchist Party (PMP) was an Italian conservative party founded in 1954 by a split from the National Monarchist Party. It was led by Achille Lauro, long-time Mayor of Naples. It took part in the 1958 election and won 14 seats to the Chamber of Deputies and 5 seats to the Senate.

In 1959, after this good  result (2.6%, while the rival PNM scored just 2.2%), the party re-joined the National Monarchist Party to form the Italian Democratic Party, latterly named Italian Democratic Party of Monarchist Unity.

Election results

Chamber of Deputies

Senate

References

Political parties established in 1954
Monarchist parties in Italy
Political parties disestablished in 1959
Defunct political parties in Italy
1954 establishments in Italy
1959 disestablishments in Italy